St Nicholas Church is in New Street, Sutton, Merseyside, England. It is an active Anglican parish church in the deanery of Saint Helens, the Archdeaconry of Warrington and the diocese of Liverpool. Its benefice is combined with those of All Saints, Sutton, and St Michael and All Angels, Sutton. The church is recorded in the National Heritage List for England as a designated Grade II listed building.

History

The church was built in 1847–49 and designed by the Lancaster architects Sharpe and Paley. Its total cost was over £3,900, to which King's College, Cambridge, patron of the church, contributed £1,270 in commemoration of the fourth centenary of its foundation. The church was consecrated on 4 June 1849 by Rt Revd John Graham, Bishop of Chester. The tower was added in 1897 and the vestry in the 1960s.

Architecture

St Nicholas is built in stone rubble with slate roofs. It is in Geometric style. The plan consists of a five-bay nave with a clerestory, north and south aisles, a west tower, a three-bay chancel with a south organ loft, a north vestry, and a south porch. The tower has diagonal buttresses, a three-light west window, two-light louvred bell openings, and a stair turret. Around the summit is an embattled parapet. The chancel has gabled buttresses, and is surmounted by a parapet supported by corbels. The stained glass in the east window dates from 1879; it was designed by Henry Holiday and depicts Faith, Hope and Charity. Elsewhere is stained glass dating from the 1850s and 1890s.

See also

Listed buildings in St Helens, Merseyside
List of works by Sharpe and Paley

References

External links
Sutton Churches

Church of England church buildings in Merseyside
Grade II listed churches in Merseyside
Churches completed in 1849
19th-century Church of England church buildings
Gothic Revival church buildings in England
Gothic Revival architecture in Merseyside
Anglican Diocese of Liverpool
Sharpe and Paley buildings
Churches in St. Helens, Merseyside
1849 establishments in England